Van Rossum is a Dutch toponymic surname. People with this surname include: 

Eric van Rossum (born 1963), Dutch footballer
 (1856–1917), Dutch landscape painter and etcher
 (born 1939), Belgian composer and pianist
 (born 1947), German historian
Guido van Rossum (born 1956), Dutch computer programmer and author of the Python programming language
Henk van Rossum (1919–2017), Dutch Reformed Political Party politician
 (1809–1873), Dutch partner of Princess Marianne of the Netherlands
Just van Rossum (born 1966), Dutch typeface designer and computer programmer, brother of Guido
Maarten van Rossum (1478–1555), Dutch (Guelders) warlord and later field marshal 
Willem Marinus van Rossum (1854–1932), Dutch Cardinal and Prefect of the Congregation for the Propagation of the Faith

See also
Rossum (disambiguation)
Van Rossem, surname of the same origin

References

Dutch-language surnames
Surnames of Dutch origin
Toponymic surnames